All I Intended to Be is the 25th studio album from Emmylou Harris and her third release on Nonesuch Records.  It was released in the United States on June 10, 2008. The album debuted at number 22 on the Billboard 200, and number four on Top Country Albums, which makes the album Harris’ highest charting solo record on the Billboard 200 since Evangeline was released in 1981. As of 2014 it has sold 153,973 copies in United States according to Nielsen SoundScan.

Album information

Harris stated that “Sailing Round the Room” was inspired by Terri Schiavo and is a celebration of life and death; “How She Could Sing the Wildwood Flower” refers to the relationship between A. P. and Sara Carter and was inspired by a documentary that Harris, together with Kate and Anna McGarrigle, saw on television. The song “Gold” features guest vocals by Dolly Parton and Vince Gill, while “Old Five and Dimers Like Me” and "Beyond the Great Divide" are duets with John Starling. “Moon Song” was written by Harris' close friend Patty Griffin and appeared as an iTunes bonus track on her 2007 album Children Running Through.

The album was made #49 in Q’s 50 Best Albums of the Year 2008.

The album was also nominated for a Grammy Award in the field of Best Contemporary Folk / Americana Album at the 2009 Grammy Awards.

The title is taken from the closing line of the track "Old Five and Dimers Like Me."

Track listing

Personnel

Emmylou Harris – vocals, acoustic guitar (1-13), harmonies (2-4, 6-13)
Brian Ahern – 12-string guitars (1, 6), baritone electric guitar (4, 7, 12), Tac-Tac bass (5), Afuche (5), Earthwood bass (6, 11), banjo (6)
Tim Goodman – acoustic guitar (1)
Emory Gordy Jr. – bass (1)
Jim Horn – recorders (1)
Keith Knudsen – drums (1)
John McFee – Cordovox and electric guitars (1)
Bill Payne – keyboards (1)
Lynn Langham – backing vocals (1)
Jack Routh – backing vocals (1)
Randy Sharp – backing vocals, vocal arrangement (1)
Glen D. Hardin – keyboards (2, 4, 5, 7, 8)
Greg Leisz – slide electric guitar (2), steel (5, 8, 10, 13), Weisenborn (8, 11), mandocello (11)
Buddy Miller – backing vocals (1), harmony vocals (2), vocals (8)
Harry Stinson – drums (2, 4-8, 12)
Kenny Vaughan – electric guitar (2, 4, 5, 7 8)
Glenn Worf – bass (2, 4, 5, 7, 8)
Steve Fishell – steel (3, 7, 12)
Mary Ann Kennedy – harmony vocals, mandolin (3, 11)
Phil Madeira – accordion (3, 9, 10, 12, 13)
David Pomeroy – bass (3, 12)
Pam Rose – harmony vocals, acoustic guitar (3, 11)
Patrick Warren – keyboards (3, 6, 11, 12)
Karen Brooks – backing vocals (1), harmony vocals (4, 7)
Dolly Parton – harmony vocals (5)
Vince Gill – harmony vocals (5)
Kate McGarrigle – vocals (3, 6, 12), gut-string guitar (6, 12), banjo solo (6)
Anna McGarrigle – vocals (3, 6, 12)
Mike Auldridge – vocals, Dobro (9, 10, 13)
John Starling – vocals, acoustic guitar (9, 10, 13)
Stuart Duncan – mandolin (9, 10, 13)
Fats Kaplin – mandolin (9)
Marc Bell – sound engineer (6, 12)

Release history

Charts

Weekly charts

Year-end charts

References

2008 albums
Emmylou Harris albums
Albums produced by Brian Ahern (producer)
Nonesuch Records albums